The Tupolev I-8 (also known as the ANT-13) was an experimental interceptor built in the Soviet Union in the early 1930s. It was the first Soviet aircraft to exceed 300 km/h (162 knots, 186 mph) in level flight. The aircraft was an exercise in developing the Polikarpov I-5 design by a group of engineers led by V. M. Rodionov, each of whom volunteered 70 hours of personal time to the project.

The I-8 first flew on 28 October 1930 with M. M. Gromov at the controls. Despite promising performance, the aircraft did not advance beyond prototype phase because there were no plans to acquire the Curtiss V-1570 engine, and no domestic equivalent was available.

Specifications (I-8)

References

1930s Soviet fighter aircraft
I-08
Single-engined tractor aircraft
Aircraft first flown in 1930